The Freelooters cricket team was a first-class cricket team of British India which took part in the Moin-ud-Dowlah Gold Cup Tournament, beginning in December 1931.  The team played in the competition until 1934 and played six first-class matches in the process.

The team was established by the Maharajkumar of Vizianagram and captained by the Maharajkumar of Alirajpur.

In the 1931-32 final Freelooters overwhelmed Aligarh Muslim University Past and Present by 432 runs; for the victors Vijay Merchant and Sorabji Colah each scored a century and Amar Singh took nine wickets.

References

External links
Freelooters at CricketArchive

Indian first-class cricket teams
Former senior cricket clubs of India